Tyne Renewable Energy Plant (or Tyne REP) was a proposed biomass power station, to be built on the north bank of the River Tyne at North Shields. The plant was developed by MGT Power, along with their similar project, the Teesport Renewable Energy Plant on Teesside. It was expected to have a generating capacity of 295 megawatts, enough to power around 600,000 homes, meaning it would have been one of the biggest of its kind in Europe. It was originally hoped the plant would be opened in 2014, costing £400 million.

The plant was planned to be built on a  industrial site at the Port of Tyne in North Shields adjacent to the proposed North Shields Bio Diesel Plant on the north bank of the River Tyne.  The construction of the plant was estimated to create around 600 jobs, as well as 150 full-time jobs once the plant was completed, and 300 to 400 indirect jobs in the supply chain. It was expected to have added an annual spend of £30 million in the local economy.

As of 2016, MGT were no longer actively pursuing plans for the plant.

References

External links

Archived version of official website

Power stations in North East England
Buildings and structures in the Metropolitan Borough of North Tyneside
Proposed biofuel power stations
Proposed renewable energy power stations in England